The World Heavyweight Championship was a professional wrestling world heavyweight championship of the Pacific Northwest defended in the states of Oregon, Washington, and California from 1930 until 1952, when it was unified with the NWA World Heavyweight Championship.

Title history
Key

Footnotes

See also
Pacific Northwest Wrestling
List of early world heavyweight champions in professional wrestling

External links
World Heavyweight title history (Northwest version)

Pacific Northwest Wrestling championships
World heavyweight wrestling championships